Blazia is a monotypic moth genus in the subfamily Lymantriinae described by Schaus in 1927. Its only species, Blazia lixivia, was first described by Paul Dognin in 1923. It lives in Bolivia.

References

Lymantriinae
Monotypic moth genera